Denis Alexandrovich Zubov (born 1981) is a Russian serial killer who killed three people in Volgograd Oblast between 2013 and 2014, cutting off reproductive organs post-mortem in order to humiliate his victims. Following a two-year Manhunt, Zubov was arrested in 2016, found guilty of all crimes and sentenced to 21 years imprisonment.

Biography
Little is known about Zubov's background. Born in 1981 in Volgograd, he resided in the city's Krasnoarmeysky District prior to moving to the Oktyabrsky District in 2009, where he had found a job as a laborer on a livestock farm. While working there, he became enamored with a female coworker, falling in love with her sunny disposition and good work ethic, and soon, they became a couple. However, the woman also got along well with other men, and to Zubov's horror, he learned that she was being courted by a 62-year-old man who also worked at the farm. Because of this, the pair began arguing regularly, and eventually broke up, with the woman returning to Volgograd and Zubov leaving the farm for good.

Murders
Angered and heartbroken by the break-up, Zubov frequently hanged around his ex-girlfriend's home on Udmurtskaya Street, where she lived with her mother. On September 1, 2013, while doing his usual routine, Zubov came across his love rival, who appeared to be severely intoxicated. Overcome with jealousy, he lured the man into a secluded area, grabbed him by the collar and threw him to the ground, beating and kicking the elderly man, who was unable to defend himself in his drunken state. After calming down a little, Zubov rummaged through his pockets and found a knife, with which he proceeded to stab the victim directly into the heart, killing him instantly. In order to further mock him, Zubov then proceeded to emasculate the body. Feeling unremorseful and confident that the police wouldn't suspect him of the murder, he returned to his apartment to rest.

Two days later, while travelling on a bus, a 70-year-old pensioner sitting across Zubov attracted his attention. When she got off at the bus stop in Raygorod, Zubov offered to escort her back to her dacha. The woman accepted his proposition, but when they arrived, her companion suddenly turned violent and began beating her. After she fell to the ground, he grabbed a nearby wrench and crashed it into the woman's head, killing her instantly. After killing the occupant, he rummaged through the dacha in search of money and valuables, stealing 1,800 rubles and an expensive wristwatch. He then dragged the body to the bedroom and placed it on the bed, taking out his knife and severing the woman's breasts. He then set the building on fire and quickly fled the area.

By then, rumors of a serial offender began spreading in the area, and so, Zubov decided to lay low for some time. He moved to the Olkhovsky District and found another job at a farm, and rekindled his previous relationship with first love. However, his overt jealousy frightened the woman, who told him that she would leave him forever. Seemingly, Zubov accepted it and left her, but continued to keep in touch with the woman. On July 27, 2014, he phoned his ex-girlfriend and asked her to meet him at the tower in the village of Zenzevatka. The pair met at the designated place and wandered off into the forest, engrossed in conversation. Soon after, they began arguing again, and in his blind rage, Zubov hit the woman in the face, knocking her to the ground. He then knelt over her and slowly choked her to death. Realizing what he had done, Zubov dug up a hole near the train station and then buried the corpse there, before quickly returning home. However, the woman's relatives had already reported her disappearance by this time, and told authorities that she had arranged a meeting with Zubov at the location. Authorities called him for in questioning, but by that time, Zubov had already fled and gone into hiding in Saratov Oblast.

Arrest, trial and imprisonment
Zubov eluded authorities for two years, before he inexplicably decided to return to Volgograd in 2016. Upon his arrival, he was immediately arrested and brought in for questioning, whereupon he broke down and confessed not only to killing his ex-girlfriend, but to the other two killings as well. His DNA was sent to testing, and was conclusively linked to biomaterial found on the pensioner's body. When asked why he had cut off the genitalia of his initial victims, Zubov claimed that he had done it to "simulate a serial killer's handwriting" and confuse the investigators.

After being found sane by a preliminary psychiatric exam, Zubov was brought to trial, where he recanted his confessions and proclaimed that he was innocent. Despite these claims, the DNA evidence proved otherwise, and he was thusly found guilty on all counts by the jury of the Volgograd Regional Court, which sentenced him to 21 years imprisonment in a corrective labor colony, with two years of probation after release.

See also
 List of Russian serial killers

References

1981 births
21st-century Russian criminals
Fugitives
Fugitives wanted by Russia
Fugitives wanted on murder charges
Living people
Male serial killers
People convicted of murder by Russia
People from Volgograd
Prisoners and detainees of Russia
Russian male criminals
Russian people convicted of murder
Russian prisoners and detainees
Russian serial killers